"I'm Your Man" is the second Japanese single by South Korean boy band, 2PM. It was released on August 17, 2011, in 3 editions: CD+DVD, CD+Photobook and a Regular edition.

Composition 
The B-side is a Japanese version of their Korean song "Without U", which served as the lead single of their EP Don't Stop Can't Stop.

Music video 
A teaser of the music video was released on July 5 into 2PM's official Japanese website. The full music video premiered on MTV Japan on July 30. In the music video the boys are dancing in various studios dressed in formal attire. There are individual scenes of each member who are dealing with relationship problems.

Live performances 
They made the first performance of the song on the August 26's episode of the TV Asahi's show Music Station. The group made another performances of the song on the shows "Happy Music" on August 27 and on "Music Japan" on August 28. The song was also performed in the 2012 MTV Video Music Awards Japan on June 23, 2012, along with "Beautiful".

Track listing

Charts

Other Charts

Awards

MTV Video Music Awards Japan

Release history

References

External links
 Official Website

2011 songs
Dance-pop songs
Japanese-language songs
2PM songs
2011 singles
Ariola Japan singles
Songs written by Park Jin-young